Saint Sylvester or Silvester may refer to:

Sylvester I (285–335), pope and Christian saint
New Year's Eve, Saint Silvester's feast day
Saint Silvester Marathon, street running competition in Brazil
San Silvestre Vallecana, street running competition in Spain
St. Sylvester, Schwabing, a church dedicated to the saint
Saint Sylvester Gozzolini
St. Silvester, a commune in Switzerland

See also
San Silvestre (disambiguation)
San Silvestro (disambiguation)
Saint-Sylvestre (disambiguation)

an:Sant Silvestre (Desambigación)
ca:Sant Silvestre